Brandon Lee Tett (born May 26, 1987) is a professional American football defensive linemen who is currently a free agent. He has also been a member of the Portland Thunder of the Arena Football League. He attended the University of Oregon and played for the school's football team.

Early life
Tett was born in Vancouver, Washington on May 26, 1987 and attended Sam Barlow High School in Gresham, Oregon. After graduation, he attended Arizona Western College in Yuma, Arizona, but later transferred to the University of Oregon in Eugene, Oregon. Tett was a walk-on for the Oregon Ducks football team in 2010. He surpassed the old record held by Igor Olshansky and Haloti Ngata who had both benched .

Professional career

Portland Thunder
The Portland Thunder, an expansion franchise in the Arena Football League (AFL), held open-tryouts on December 18, 2013 at the Moda Center. Out of nearly 200 players, Tett, Brandon Lockheart and Dustin Risseeuw were invited to training camp. By the start of the 2014 season, Tett had signed with the Thunder.

Calgary Stampeders
Though born in the U.S., Tett qualifies as a national in the Canadian Football League because his mother is a native of Courtenay, B.C., and he has held Canadian citizenship since he was six years old. 

On July 7, 2015, the Stampeders selected Brandon in the CFL Supplemental Draft. By making the selection, the Stampeders forfeited their seventh-round pick in the 2016 regular draft.

On September 15, 2015, Tett was added to the Stampeders practice roster.

On July 28, 2016, Tett was assigned to the Orlando Predators.

References

1987 births
Sportspeople from Vancouver, Washington
Sportspeople from Gresham, Oregon
American football linebackers
American football defensive linemen
Arizona Western Matadors football players
Oregon Ducks football players
Portland Thunder players
Calgary Stampeders players
Orlando Predators players
Living people